Dragaš, derived from the Slavic word for dear (drago), may refer to:

Placenames:
 Dragaš, a town and municipality in Kosovo

People:
 Dejanović noble family or Dragaš noble family (fl. 1355–1395), of the Serbian Empire
 Dejan Dragaš (fl. 1355), nobleman
 Jovan Dragaš (1343–1378), nobleman
 Konstantin Dragaš (d. 1395), nobleman
 Helena Dragaš (Serbian Latin: Jelena Dragaš), Empress consort of the Byzantine Empire, married to Manuel II Palaiologos (r. 1391–1425)
 Constantine XI Palaiologos Dragases (Serbian Latin: Konstantin XI Paleolog Dragaš), last Byzantine Emperor (1449–1453)
 Nikola Dragaš (b. 1944), Croatian 9-pin-bowler
Other:
 Dragaš (surname)
 Dragaš (given name), masculine given name

See also
 Dragas (disambiguation)
 Drago (disambiguation)
 Draga (disambiguation)
 Dragan